The Los Angeles Dodgers are an American professional baseball team based in Los Angeles. The Dodgers compete in Major League Baseball (MLB) as a member club of the National League (NL) West division. Established in 1883 in the city of Brooklyn, which later became a borough of New York City, the team joined the NL in 1890 as the Brooklyn Bridegrooms and assumed several different monikers thereafter before finally settling on the name Dodgers in 1932. From the 1940s through the mid-1950s, the Dodgers developed a fierce cross-town rivalry with the New York Yankees as the two clubs faced each other in the World Series seven times, with the Dodgers losing the first five matchups before defeating them to win the franchise's first title in 1955. It was also during this period that the Dodgers made history by breaking the baseball color line in 1947 with the debut of Jackie Robinson, the first African-American to play in the Major Leagues since 1884. Another major milestone was reached in 1956 when Don Newcombe became the first player ever to win both the Cy Young Award and the NL MVP in the same season.

After 68 seasons in Brooklyn, Dodgers owner and president Walter O'Malley relocated the franchise to Los Angeles before the 1958 season. The team played their first four seasons at the Los Angeles Memorial Coliseum before moving to their current home of Dodger Stadium in 1962. The Dodgers found immediate success in Los Angeles by winning the 1959 World Series, representing the franchise's first championship since moving to Los Angeles. Success continued into the 1960s with their one-two punch ace pitchers Sandy Koufax and Don Drysdale being the cornerstones of two more titles in 1963 and 1965. During the 1980s, Mexican phenom pitcher Fernando Valenzuela quickly became a sensation—affectionately referred to as "Fernandomania"—when he led the team as a rookie to another championship in 1981. Valenzuela became the first and, to date, the only player to ever win the Cy Young and Rookie of the Year awards in the same season. The Dodgers were once again victorious in 1988, upsetting their heavily favored opponent in each series and becoming the first and only franchise to win multiple titles in the 80s. After a 32-year drought, which included 12 postseason appearances in a 17-year span and eight consecutive division titles from 2013 to 2020, the Dodgers won the 2020 World Series.

One of the most successful and storied franchises in MLB, the Dodgers have won seven World Series championships and a record 24 National League pennants. Eleven NL MVP award winners have played for the Dodgers, winning a total of 14. Eight Cy Young Award winners have pitched for the club, winning a total of 12—by far the most of any Major League franchise. Additionally, the Dodgers boast 18 Rookie of the Year Award winners—twice as many as the next club. This includes four consecutive Rookies of the Year from 1979 to 1982 and five consecutive from 1992 to 1996. From 1884 through 2021, the Dodgers' all-time record is 11,123–9,891.

Today, the Dodgers are among the most popular MLB teams, enjoying large fan support both at home and on the road; they are widely seen as the most dominant team in the National League in the present day. They maintain a fierce rivalry with the San Francisco Giants dating back to when the two clubs were based in New York City, as well as a more recent rivalry with the American League's Houston Astros due to their role as the victims of the Astros' sign stealing scandal in the 2017 World Series. As of 2022, Forbes ranks the Dodgers second in MLB franchise valuation at $4.075 billion.

History

In the early 20th century, the team, then sometimes called the Brooklyn Robins after manager Wilbert Robinson, won league pennants in 1916 and 1920. The Robins lost the World Series both times, first to Boston and then Cleveland. In the 1930s, the team officially adopted the Dodgers nickname, which had been in use since the 1890s, named after the Brooklyn pedestrians who dodged the streetcars in the city.

In 1941, the Dodgers captured their third National League pennant, only to lose to the New York Yankees. This marked the onset of the Dodgers–Yankees rivalry, as the Dodgers would face them in their next six World Series appearances. Led by Jackie Robinson, the first black Major League Baseball player of the modern era; and three-time National League Most Valuable Player Roy Campanella, also signed out of the Negro leagues, the Dodgers captured their first World Series title in 1955 by defeating the Yankees for the first time, a story notably described in the 1972 book The Boys of Summer.

Following the 1957 season the team left Brooklyn. In just their second season in Los Angeles, the Dodgers won their second World Series title, beating the Chicago White Sox in six games in 1959. Spearheaded by the dominant pitching style of Sandy Koufax and Don Drysdale, the Dodgers captured three pennants in the 1960s and won two more World Series titles, sweeping the Yankees in four games in 1963, and edging the Minnesota Twins in seven in 1965. The 1963 sweep was their second victory against the Yankees, and their first against them as a Los Angeles team. The Dodgers won four more pennants in 1966, 1974, 1977 and 1978, but lost in each World Series appearance. They went on to win the World Series again in 1981, thanks in part to pitching sensation Fernando Valenzuela.

The early 1980s were affectionately dubbed "Fernandomania." In 1988, another pitching hero, Orel Hershiser, again led them to a World Series victory, aided by one of the most memorable home runs of all time by their star outfielder Kirk Gibson coming off the bench, despite having injuries to both knees, to pinch-hit with two outs in the bottom of the ninth inning of game 1, in his only appearance of the series. The Dodgers won the pennant in 2017 for the first time since their world series victory in 1988, aided by a Justin Turner walk-off home run on the same night of Gibson's iconic walk-off home run 29 years earlier. They went on to face the Houston Astros and lose in 7 games; however, the series became embroiled in controversy due to the Houston Astros sign stealing scandal. The Dodgers won the pennant in 2018 for a second year in a row, moving on to lose to the Boston Red Sox in 5 games. They went on to win the World Series again in 2020 by defeating the Tampa Bay Rays in 6 games, after playing a season shortened to 60 games due to the COVID-19 pandemic.

The Dodgers share a fierce rivalry with the San Francisco Giants, dating back to when the two franchises played in New York City. Both teams moved west for the 1958 season. The Brooklyn/Los Angeles Dodgers have appeared in the World Series 21 times, while the New York/San Francisco Giants have appeared in the World Series 20 times. The Giants have won one more World Series (8); when the two teams were based in New York, the Giants won five World Series championships, and the Dodgers one. After the move to California, the Dodgers have won six World Series while the Giants have won three.

In Brooklyn, the Dodgers won the NL pennant twelve times (1890, 1899, 1900, 1916, 1920, 1941, 1947, 1949, 1952, 1953, 1955, 1956) and the World Series in 1955. After moving to Los Angeles, the team won National League pennants in 1959, 1963, 1965, 1966, 1974, 1977, 1978, 1981, 1988, 2017, 2018, and 2020, with World Series championships in 1959, 1963, 1965, 1981, 1988, and 2020. In all, the Dodgers have appeared in 21 World Series: 9 in Brooklyn and 12 in Los Angeles.

Team history

Brooklyn Dodgers

The Dodgers were founded in 1883 as the Brooklyn Atlantics, borrowing the name of a defunct team that had played in Brooklyn before them. The team joined the American Association in 1884 and won the AA championship in 1889 before joining the National League in 1890. They promptly won the NL Championship their first year in the League. The team was known alternatively as the Bridegrooms,  Grooms, Superbas, Robins, and Trolley Dodgers before officially becoming the Brooklyn Dodgers in the 1930s.

Jackie Robinson

For most of the first half of the 20th century, no Major League Baseball team employed an African American player. Jackie Robinson became the first African American to play for a Major League Baseball team when he played his first major league game on April 15, 1947, as a member of the Brooklyn Dodgers. This was mainly due to general manager Branch Rickey's efforts. The deeply religious Rickey's motivation appears to have been primarily moral, although business considerations were also a factor. Rickey was a member of The Methodist Church, the antecedent denomination to The United Methodist Church of today, which was a strong advocate for social justice and active later in the American Civil Rights Movement.

This event was the harbinger of the integration of professional sports in the United States, the concomitant demise of the Negro leagues, and is regarded as a key moment in the history of the American Civil Rights Movement. Robinson was an exceptional player, a speedy runner who sparked the team with his intensity. He was the inaugural recipient of the Rookie of the Year award, which is now named the Jackie Robinson Award in his honor. The Dodgers' willingness to integrate, when most other teams refused to, was a key factor in their 1947–1956 success. They won six pennants in those 10 years with the help of Robinson, three-time MVP Roy Campanella, Cy Young Award winner Don Newcombe, Jim Gilliam and Joe Black. Robinson would eventually go on to become the first African-American elected to the Baseball Hall of Fame in 1962.

Move to California

Real estate investor Walter O'Malley acquired majority ownership of the Dodgers in 1950, when he bought the 25 percent share of co-owner Branch Rickey and became allied with the widow of another equal partner, Mrs. John L. Smith. Shortly afterwards, he was working to buy new land in Brooklyn to build a more accessible and profitable ballpark than the aging Ebbets Field. Beloved as it was, Ebbets Field was no longer well-served by its aging infrastructure and the Dodgers could no longer sell out the park even in the heat of a pennant race, despite largely dominating the National League from 1946 to 1957.

O'Malley wanted to build a new, state-of-the-art stadium in Brooklyn. But City Planner Robert Moses and New York politicians refused to grant him the eminent domain authority required to build pursuant to O'Malley's plans. To put pressure on the city, during the 1955 season, O'Malley announced that the team would play seven regular-season games and one exhibition game at Jersey City's Roosevelt Stadium in 1956. Moses and the City considered this an empty threat, and did not believe O'Malley would go through with moving the team from New York City.

After teams began to travel to and from games by air instead of train, it became possible to include locations in the far west. Los Angeles officials attended the 1956 World Series looking to the Washington Senators to move to the West Coast. When O'Malley heard that LA was looking for a club, he sent word to the Los Angeles officials that he was interested in talking. LA offered him what New York would not: a chance to buy land suitable for building a ballpark, and own that ballpark, giving him complete control over all revenue streams. When the news came out, NYC Mayor Robert F. Wagner, Jr. and Moses made an offer to build a ballpark on the World's Fair Grounds in Queens that would be shared by the Giants and Dodgers. However, O'Malley was interested in his park under only his conditions, and the plans for a new stadium in Brooklyn seemed like a pipe dream. O'Malley decided to move the Dodgers to California, convincing Giants owner Horace Stoneham to move to San Francisco instead of Minneapolis to keep the Giants-Dodgers rivalry alive on the West Coast.

The Dodgers played their final game at Ebbets Field on September 24, 1957, which the Dodgers won 2–0 over the Pittsburgh Pirates.

New York remained a one-team town with the New York Yankees until 1962, when Joan Payson founded the New York Mets and brought National League baseball back to the city. The blue background used by the Dodgers was adopted by the Mets, honoring their New York NL forebears with a blend of Dodgers blue and Giants orange.

Los Angeles Dodgers

The Dodgers were the first Major League Baseball team to ever play in Los Angeles. On April 18, 1958, the Dodgers played their first LA game, defeating the former New York and now new San Francisco Giants, 6–5, before 78,672 fans at the Los Angeles Memorial Coliseum. Catcher Roy Campanella, left partially paralyzed in an off-season accident, was never able to play in Los Angeles.

Construction on Dodger Stadium was completed in time for Opening Day 1962. With its clean, simple lines and its picturesque setting amid hills and palm trees, the ballpark quickly became an icon of the Dodgers and their new California lifestyle. O'Malley was determined that there would not be a bad seat in the house, achieving this by cantilevered grandstands that have since been widely imitated. More importantly for the team, the stadium's spacious dimensions, along with other factors, gave defense an advantage over offense and the Dodgers moved to take advantage of this by assembling a team that would excel with its pitching.

Since moving to Los Angeles, the Dodgers have won 12 more National League Championships and six more World Series rings.

Other historical notes

Historical records and firsts
First baseball team to win championships in different leagues in consecutive years (1889–1890)
First television broadcast (1939)
First use of batting helmets (1941)
First MLB team to employ and start an African-American player in the 20th century (Jackie Robinson, 1947)
First MLB team to have numbers on the front of their uniforms (1952)
First West Coast team (1958) – along with the San Francisco Giants
First Western team to win a World Series (1959)
First MLB team to allow a female sports journalist into a locker room (Anita Martini, 1974)
First MLB team to establish a baseball academy in the Dominican Republic when they opened the doors to Campo Las Palmas (1987)
Largest home-opener attendance: 78,672 (1958) (since broken by the Colorado Rockies in 1993)
Largest single game attendance: 93,103 (1959) and 115,300 (2008) *World Record
First MLB team to open an office in Asia (1998)
Longest MLB record for home start going 13–0 (2009)
North American record for the buying of a sports team ($2 billion, 2012)
Most no-hitters (26)
Most Cy Young award winners (12)
First MLB team to employ a female lead trainer (Sue Falsone, 2012)
11,000 franchise wins 8-30-2020 (vs Texas)
Most runs scored in a single inning of a postseason game (11 runs in 2020 NLCS Game 3, 2020)
Most Rookie of the Year awards (18) 
First team to draw 3 million fans
First team to have a pair of two-slam games in a season (2021)

Origin of the nickname
The Dodgers' official history reports that the term "Trolley Dodgers" was attached to the Brooklyn ballclub due to the complex maze of trolley cars that weaved its way through the borough of Brooklyn.

In 1892, the city of Brooklyn (Brooklyn was an independent city until annexed by New York City in 1898) began replacing its slow-moving, horse-drawn trolley lines with the faster, more powerful electric trolley lines. Within less than three years, by the end of 1895, electric trolley accidents in Brooklyn had resulted in more than 130 deaths and maimed well over 500 people. Brooklyn's high profile, the significant number of widely reported accidents, and a trolley strike in early 1895, combined to create a strong association in the public's mind between Brooklyn and trolley dodging.

Sportswriters started using the name "Trolley Dodgers" to refer to the Brooklyn team early in the 1895 season. The name was shortened to, on occasion, the "Brooklyn Dodgers" as early as 1898.

Sportswriters in the early 20th century began referring to the Dodgers as the "Bums", in reference to the team's fans and possibly because of the "street character" nature of Jack Dawkins, the "Artful Dodger" in Charles Dickens' Oliver Twist. Newspaper cartoonist Willard Mullin used a drawing of famous clown Emmett Kelly to depict "Dem Bums": the team would later use "Weary Willie" in promotional images, and Kelly himself was a club mascot during the 1950s.

Other team names used by the franchise were the Atlantics, Grays, Grooms, Bridegrooms, Superbas and Robins. All of these nicknames were used by fans and sportswriters to describe the team, but not in any official capacity. The team's legal name was the Brooklyn Base Ball Club. However, the Trolley Dodger nickname was used throughout this period, simultaneously with these other nicknames, by fans and sportswriters of the day. The team did not use the name in any formal sense until 1932, when the word "Dodgers" appeared on team jerseys. The "conclusive shift" came in 1933, when both home and road jerseys for the team bore the name "Dodgers".

Examples of how the many popularized names of the team were used are available from newspaper articles before 1932. A New York Times article describing a game in 1916 starts out: "Jimmy Callahan, pilot of the Pirates, did his best to wreck the hopes the Dodgers have of gaining the National League pennant", but then goes on to comment: "the only thing that saved the Superbas from being toppled from first place was that the Phillies lost one of the two games played". What is interesting about the use of these two nicknames is that most baseball statistics sites and baseball historians generally now refer to the pennant-winning 1916 Brooklyn team as the Robins. A 1918 New York Times article uses the nickname in its title: "Buccaneers Take Last From Robins", but the subtitle of the article reads: "Subdue The Superbas By 11 To 4, Making Series An Even Break".

Another example of the use of the many nicknames is found on the program issued at Ebbets Field for the 1920 World Series, which identifies the matchup in the series as "Dodgers vs. Indians" despite the fact that the Robins nickname had been in consistent use for around six years. The "Robins" nickname was derived from the name of their Hall of Fame manager, Wilbert Robinson, who led the team from 1914 to 1931.

Uniforms

The Dodgers' uniform has remained relatively unchanged since the 1930s. The home jersey is white with "Dodgers" written in script across the chest in royal. The road jersey is gray with "Los Angeles" written in script across the chest in royal. The word "Dodgers" was first used on the front of the team's home jersey in 1933; the uniform was then white with red pinstripes and a stylized "B" on the left shoulder. The Dodgers also wore green outlined uniforms and green caps throughout the 1937 season but reverted to blue the following year.

The current design was created in 1939, and has remained the same ever since with only cosmetic changes. Originally intended for the 1951 World Series for which the ballclub failed to qualify, red numbers under the "Dodgers" script were added to the home uniform in 1952. The road jersey also has a red uniform number under the script. When the franchise moved from Brooklyn to Los Angeles, the city name on the road jersey changed, and the stylized "B" was replaced with the interlocking "LA" on the caps in 1958. In 1970, the Dodgers removed the city name from the road jerseys and had "Dodgers" on both the home and away uniforms. The city script returned to the road jerseys in 1999, and the tradition-rich Dodgers flirted with an alternate uniform for the first time since 1944 (when all-blue satin uniforms were introduced). These 1999 alternate jerseys had a royal top with the "Dodgers" script in white across the chest, and the red number on the front. These were worn with white pants and a new cap with silver brim, top button and Dodger logo. These alternates proved unpopular and the team abandoned them after only one season. In 2014, the Dodgers introduced an alternate road jersey: a gray version with the "Dodgers" script instead of the city name. Since its introduction, however, the road jersey with the "Dodgers" script was used more often than the road jersey with the "Los Angeles" script, so much that the team now considers it as a primary road uniform. In 2018, the Dodgers wore their 60th anniversary patch to honor the 60 years of being in Los Angeles.

In 2021, the Dodgers again unveiled a blue alternate uniform, this time as part of the "City Connect" series in collaboration with Nike. This uniform was similar to the blue alternates they wore in 1999, but with the script "Los Dodgers" in homage to Los Angeles' Latino community. The uniform is also worn with blue pants, and black stripes are added to the sleeves. Initially, the Dodgers wore a special blue cap with the "Los Dodgers" script, but switched in 2022 to a blue interlocking "LA" cap with black brim. The "Los Dodgers" script was then relocated to the right side.

Asian players

The Dodgers have been groundbreaking in their signing of players from Asia; mainly Japan, South Korea, and Taiwan. Former owner Peter O'Malley began reaching out in 1980 by starting clinics in China and South Korea, building baseball fields in two Chinese cities, and in 1998 becoming the first major league team to open an office in Asia. The Dodgers were the second team to start a Japanese player in recent history, pitcher Hideo Nomo, the first team to start a South Korean player, pitcher Chan Ho Park, and the first Taiwanese player, Chin-Feng Chen. In addition, they were the first team to send out three Asian pitchers, from different Asian countries, in one game: Park, Hong-Chih Kuo of Taiwan, and Takashi Saito of Japan. In the 2008 season, the Dodgers had the most Asian players on its roster of any major league team with five. They included Japanese pitchers Takashi Saito and Hiroki Kuroda; South Korean pitcher Chan Ho Park; and Taiwanese pitcher Hong-Chih Kuo and infielder Chin-Lung Hu. In 2005, the Dodgers' Hee Seop Choi became the first Asian player to compete in the Home Run Derby. For the 2013 season, the Dodgers signed starting pitcher Hyun-Jin Ryu with a six-year, $36 million contract, after posting a bid of nearly $27 million to acquire him from the KBO's Hanhwa Eagles. For the 2016 season, the Dodgers signed starting pitcher Kenta Maeda with an eight-year, $25 million contract, after posting a bid of $20 million to acquire him from the NPB's Hiroshima Toyo Carp.

Rivalries
The Dodgers' rivalry with the San Francisco Giants dates back to the 19th century, when the two teams were based in New York; the rivalry with the New York Yankees took place when the Dodgers were based in New York, but was revived with their East Coast/West Coast World Series battles in 1963, 1977, 1978, and 1981. The Dodgers' rivalries with the Philadelphia Phillies and St. Louis Cardinals also dates back to their days in New York, but was most fierce during the 1970s, 1980s, and 2000s. The Dodgers also had a heated rivalry with the Cincinnati Reds during the 1970s, 1980s and early 1990s. The intra-city rivalry with the Los Angeles Angels dates back to the Angels' inaugural season in 1961. Most recently the Dodgers have also revived an old Southern California based rivalry with the San Diego Padres which dates back to the Padres' inaugural season in 1969.

San Francisco Giants

The Dodgers–Giants rivalry is one of the longest-standing rivalries in U.S. baseball.

The feud between the Dodgers and the San Francisco Giants began in the late 19th century when both clubs were based in New York City, with the Dodgers playing in Brooklyn and the Giants playing at the Polo Grounds in Manhattan. After the 1957 season, Dodgers owner Walter O'Malley moved the team to Los Angeles for financial and other reasons. Along the way, he managed to convince Giants owner Horace Stoneham—who was considering moving his team to Minnesota—to preserve the rivalry by bringing his team to California as well. New York baseball fans were stunned and heartbroken by the move. Given that the cities of Los Angeles and San Francisco have been bitter rivals in economic, cultural, and political arenas for over a century and a half, the new venue in California became fertile ground for its transplantation.

Each team's ability to endure for over a century while moving across an entire continent, as well as the rivalry's leap from a cross-city to a cross-state engagement, have led to the rivalry being considered one of the greatest in American sports history.

Unlike many other historic baseball match-ups in which one team remains dominant for most of their history, the Dodgers–Giants rivalry has exhibited a persistent balance in the respective successes of the two teams. While the Giants have more wins in franchise history, the Dodgers have the most National League pennants at 24, with the Giants following close behind at 23. The Giants have won eight World Series titles, while the Dodgers have won seven. The 2010 World Series was the Giants' first championship since moving to California, while the Dodgers had won six World Series titles since their move, their last title coming in the 2020 World Series.

Los Angeles Angels 

This rivalry refers to a series of games played with the Los Angeles Angels. The Freeway Series takes its name from the massive freeway system in the greater Los Angeles metropolitan area, the home of both teams; one could travel from one team's stadium to the other simply by traveling along Interstate 5. The term is akin to Subway Series which refers to meetings between New York City baseball teams. The term "Freeway Series" also inspired the official name of the region's NHL rivalry: the Freeway Face-Off.

Animosity between the team's fanbases grew stronger in 2005, when the Angels' new team owner Arte Moreno changed the name of his ball club from the 'Anaheim Angels', to the 'Los Angeles Angels of Anaheim'. Since the city of Anaheim is located roughly 30 miles from Downtown Los Angeles, the Angels franchise was ridiculed throughout the league for the contradictory nature surrounding the name, especially by Dodgers owner Frank McCourt, who filed a formal complaint to commissioner Bud Selig. Once the complaint was denied, McCourt devised a t-shirt mocking the crosstown rivals reading 'The Los Angeles Dodgers of Los Angeles', which remains popular amongst the fanbase to this day.

San Diego Padres 

The Padres-Dodgers rivalry has often been lopsided in favor of the Dodgers, however; recent growth between the two teams in competition has added intensity on top of proximity between Los Angeles and San Diego. San Diego fans have often harbored animosity towards Los Angeles due in small part to San Diego being an unstable home for their sports teams as both the Chargers and the Clippers both relocated to Los Angeles after being unable to find a secure future in San Diego. 

The Dodgers currently lead the series 506-412 on top of a sweep in the lone playoff meeting between the two teams during the 2020 NLDS.

New York Yankees 

The Dodgers–Yankees rivalry is one of the most well-known rivalries in Major League Baseball. The two teams have met eleven times in the World Series, more times than any other pair from the American and National Leagues. The initial significance was embodied in the two teams' proximity in New York City, when the Dodgers initially played in Brooklyn. After the Dodgers moved to Los Angeles in 1958, the rivalry retained its significance as the two teams represented the dominant cities on each coast of the United States, and since the 1980s, the two largest cities in the United States.

Although the rivalry's significance arose from the two teams' numerous World Series meetings, the Yankees and Dodgers have not met in the World Series since . They would not play each other in a non-exhibition game until 2004, when they played a three-game interleague series. Their last meeting was in August 2019, when the Yankees won two out of three games in Los Angeles.

St. Louis Cardinals 

Primarily a playoff rivalry; since 1892, The Dodgers and St. Louis Cardinals have met 6 times in the postseason with 2 meetings in the NLCS falling in favor of the Cardinals. Both teams have recently grown a history of animosity towards one another since the late 2000s as both teams often met frequently in the postseason. The Dodgers have not fared as well against the Cardinals in the postseason. In five prior postseason series matchups, the Cardinals have won four with the Dodgers winning only the 2009 NLDS and the 2021 National League Wild Card Game.

Fan support

The Dodgers have a loyal fanbase, evidenced by the fact that the Dodgers were the first MLB team to attract more than 3 million fans in a season (in 1978), and accomplished that feat six more times before any other franchise did it once. The Dodgers drew at least 3 million fans for 15 consecutive seasons from 1996 to 2010, the longest such streak among all MLB teams. The team's largest fan club, Pantone 294 (a reference to the Pantone code of Dodger blue), regularly travel to away games to cheer for the Dodgers.

On July 3, 2007, Dodgers management announced that total franchise attendance, dating back to 1901, had reached 175 million, a record for all professional sports. In 2007, the Dodgers set a franchise record for single-season attendance, attracting over 3.8 million fans. On March 28, 2008, the Dodgers set the world record for the largest attendance for a single baseball game during an exhibition game against the Boston Red Sox at the Los Angeles Memorial Coliseum in honor of the Dodgers' 50th anniversary, with 115,300 fans in attendance. In 2009, the Dodgers led MLB in total attendance. The Dodger baseball cap is consistently in the top three in sales.

Given the team's proximity to Hollywood, numerous celebrities can often be seen attending home games at Dodger Stadium. Celebrities such as co-owner Magic Johnson, Mary Hart, DaBaby, Larry King, Tiger Woods, Alyssa Milano, Shia LaBeouf, Lana Del Rey, Mila Kunis and Ashton Kutcher are known to frequently attend Dodger games, with some sitting at field box seats behind home plate where they sign autographs for fellow Dodger fans. Actor Bryan Cranston is a lifelong Dodger fan.

Primarily, Dodgers fans are from their own location in southern California and also parts of southern Nevada. However, there are also numerous strong pockets of supporters in Mexico due to the impact of players such as Fernando Valenzuela or more recently; Julio Urias and the fanbase is ever present throughout Asian countries such as South Korea and Japan, and their away games throughout the US will usually attract substantial numbers of expats and traveling fans.

Radio and television

From 1950 to 2016, almost all Dodger games were called by Vin Scully. His longtime partners were Jerry Doggett (1956–1987) and Ross Porter (1977–2004). In 1976, he was selected by Dodgers fans as the Most Memorable Personality (on the field or off) in the team's history. He is also a recipient of the Baseball Hall of Fame's Ford C. Frick Award for broadcasters (inducted in 1982). Unlike the modern style in which multiple sportscasters have an on-air conversation (usually with one functioning as play-by-play announcer and the other[s] as color commentator), Scully, Doggett and Porter generally called games solo, trading with each other inning-by-inning. In the 1980s and 1990s, Scully would call the entire radio broadcast except for the third and seventh inning, allowing the other Dodger commentators to broadcast an inning. Fans and critics alike often praised Scully due in large part for his longevity with the team and his ability to provide peculiar details about multiple players appearing onfield. Despite his longevity and a strong relationship with the team and fanbase, Scully was also praised for his relatively unbiased view of any game he called, often referring to the listeners as 'friends' instead of 'fans'.

When Doggett retired after the 1987 season, he was replaced by Hall-of-Fame Dodgers pitcher Don Drysdale, who previously broadcast games for the California Angels and Chicago White Sox. Drysdale died in his hotel room following a heart attack before a game in Montreal in 1993. This was a difficult broadcast for Scully and Porter who could not mention it on-air until Drysdale's family had been notified and the official announcement made. He was replaced by former Dodgers outfielder Rick Monday. Porter's tenure ended after the 2004 season, after which the format of play-by-play announcers and color commentators was installed, led by Monday and newcomer Charley Steiner. Scully, however, continued to announce solo.

Scully called roughly 100 games per season (all home games and road games in California and Arizona) for both flagship radio station KLAC and on television for Spectrum SportsNet LA. Scully was simulcast for the first three innings of each of his appearances, then announced only for the TV audience. If Scully was calling the game, Steiner took over play-by-play on radio beginning with the fourth inning, with Monday as color commentator. If Scully was not calling the game, Steiner and Orel Hershiser called the entire game on television while Monday and Kevin Kennedy did the same on radio. In the event the Dodgers were in post-season play, Scully called the first three and last three innings of the radio broadcast alone and Steiner and Monday handled the middle innings. Vin Scully retired from calling games in 2016. His tenure with the Dodgers was the longest with any single sports team at 67 years. Youthful announcer Joe Davis was selected in 2017 by Dodgers management to handle play by play on television with Orel Hershiser as his colorman; when Davis is on assignment for Fox Sports' MLB and NFL broadcasts, Tim Neverett would fill in.

The Dodgers also broadcast on radio in two other languages, Spanish and Korean. In Spanish, the play-by-play is voiced by another Frick Award winner, Jaime Jarrín, who has been with the Dodgers since 1959. The color analyst for some games is former Dodger pitcher Fernando Valenzuela, for whom Jarrin once translated post-game interviews. The Spanish-language radio flagship station is KTNQ. Meanwhile, the Dodgers' Korean broadcast began in 2013 through KMPC.

Management

Owner: Guggenheim Baseball Management
Chairman/Controlling Partner: Mark Walter
Partner: Earvin "Magic" Johnson
Partner: Peter Guber
Partner: Todd Boehly
 Partner: Billie Jean King
Partner: Ilana Kloss
Partner: Robert "Bobby" Patton, Jr.
Partner: Alan Smolinisky
Partner: Robert L. Plummer
President/chief executive officer: Stan Kasten
President of Baseball Operations: Andrew Friedman
General Manager: Brandon Gomes

Achievements

Baseball Hall of Famers

Ford C. Frick Award recipients

Team captains
 Leo Durocher 1938–1941
 Pee Wee Reese 1950–1958
 Duke Snider 1962
 Maury Wills 1963–1966
 Davey Lopes 1978–1979

Retired numbers

Koufax, Campanella, and Robinson were the first Dodgers to have their numbers retired, in a ceremony at Dodger Stadium on June 4, 1972. This was the year in which Koufax was inducted into the Baseball Hall of Fame; Robinson and Campanella were already Hall-of-Famers.

Alston's number was retired in the year following his retirement as the Dodgers manager, six years before he was inducted into the Hall of Fame.

Gilliam died suddenly in 1978 after a 28-year career with the Dodgers organization. The Dodgers retired his number two days after his death, prior to Game 1 of the 1978 World Series. As of 2018, he is the only non-Hall-of-Famer to have his number retired by the Dodgers (Alston's number was retired before he was elected to the Hall of Fame).

Beginning in 1980, the Dodgers have retired the numbers of longtime Dodgers (Snider, Reese, Drysdale, Lasorda, Sutton, and Hodges) during the seasons in which each was inducted into the Hall of Fame.

In 1997, 50 years after he broke the color barrier and 25 years after the Dodgers retired his number, Robinson's No. 42 was retired throughout Major League Baseball. Robinson is the only major league baseball player to have this honor bestowed upon him. Starting in the 2007 season, Jackie Robinson Day (April 15, commemorating Opening Day of Robinson's rookie season of 1947) has featured many or all players and coaches wearing the number 42 as a tribute to Robinson.

In 2017, the Dodgers honored broadcaster Vin Scully with a microphone displayed alongside the team's retired numbers.

In 2018 Spanish language broadcaster Jaime Jarrín was honored with a microphone displayed alongside the team's retired numbers.

Out of circulation, but not retired
The Dodgers have not issued the number 34 since the departure of Fernando Valenzuela in 1991 and have plans to officially retire the number during the 2023 season.

Legends of Dodger Baseball
Created in 2019 to honor Dodger greats who made an "impact on the franchise, both on and off the field." Recipients are recognized with  plaques at Dodger Stadium.

Steve Garvey 
Don Newcombe
Fernando Valenzuela
Maury Wills

Awards

Most Valuable Player (NL)
 Brooklyn
 – Jake Daubert
1924 – Dazzy Vance
1941 – Dolph Camilli
1949 – Jackie Robinson
1951 – Roy Campanella
1953 – Roy Campanella
1955 – Roy Campanella
1956 – Don Newcombe
 Los Angeles
1962 – Maury Wills
1963 – Sandy Koufax
1974 – Steve Garvey
1988 – Kirk Gibson
2014 – Clayton Kershaw
2019 – Cody Bellinger

World Series MVP
1955 – Johnny Podres
1959 – Larry Sherry
1963 – Sandy Koufax
1965 – Sandy Koufax
1981 – Ron Cey, Pedro Guerrero and Steve Yeager
1988 – Orel Hershiser
2020 – Corey Seager

Cy Young Award (NL)
 Brooklyn
1956 – Don Newcombe (MLB)
 Los Angeles
1962 – Don Drysdale (MLB)
1963 – Sandy Koufax (MLB)
1965 – Sandy Koufax (MLB)
1966 – Sandy Koufax (MLB)
1974 – Mike Marshall
1981 – Fernando Valenzuela
1988 – Orel Hershiser
2003 – Éric Gagné
2011 – Clayton Kershaw
2013 – Clayton Kershaw
2014 – Clayton Kershaw

Triple Crown
 Brooklyn
1924 – Dazzy Vance
 Los Angeles
1963 – Sandy Koufax
1965 – Sandy Koufax
1966 – Sandy Koufax
2011 – Clayton Kershaw

Rookie of the Year Award (NL)
 Brooklyn
1947 – Jackie Robinson (MLB)
1949 – Don Newcombe
1952 – Joe Black
1953 – Jim Gilliam
 Los Angeles
1960 – Frank Howard
1965 – Jim Lefebvre
1969 – Ted Sizemore
1979 – Rick Sutcliffe
1980 – Steve Howe
1981 – Fernando Valenzuela
1982 – Steve Sax
1992 – Eric Karros
1993 – Mike Piazza
1994 – Raúl Mondesi
1995 – Hideo Nomo
1996 – Todd Hollandsworth
2016 – Corey Seager
2017 – Cody Bellinger

Team records

Personnel

Current roster

Presidents

Charlie Byrne (1883–1897)
Charles Ebbets (1898–1925)
Edward McKeever (1925, interim)
Wilbert Robinson (1925–1929)
Frank B. York (1930–1932)
Stephen McKeever (1933–1938)
Larry MacPhail (1939–1942)
Branch Rickey (1943–1950)
Walter O'Malley (1950–1970)
Peter O'Malley (1970–1997)
Bob Graziano (1998–2004)
Jamie McCourt (2004–2009)
Dennis Mannion (2009–2010)
Stan Kasten (2012–present)

Managers

Since 1884, the Dodgers have used a total of 31 Managers, the most current being Dave Roberts, who was appointed following the 2015 postseason, after the departure of Don Mattingly.

Over the nearly 43 years from 1954 to mid-1996, the Dodgers employed only two managers, Walter Alston and Tommy Lasorda, both of whom are in the Hall of Fame. During this entire time period of extraordinary stability, the Dodgers were family-owned by Walter O'Malley and then his son Peter O'Malley. It was during this era that the Dodgers won 11 of their 24 pennants, and their first six World Series championships.

The managers of the Los Angeles Dodgers (1958–present) are as follows:
Walter Alston (1958–1976) (in Brooklyn since 1954)
Tommy Lasorda (1976–1996)
Bill Russell (1996–1998)
Glenn Hoffman (1998)
Davey Johnson (1999–2000)
Jim Tracy (2001–2005)
Grady Little (2006–2007)
Joe Torre (2008–2010)
Don Mattingly (2011–2015)
Dave Roberts (2016–present)

General Managers
Larry MacPhail (1938–1942)
Branch Rickey (1943–1950)
Buzzie Bavasi (1950–1968)
Fresco Thompson (1968)
Al Campanis (1968–1987)
Fred Claire (1987–1998)
Tommy Lasorda (1998)
Kevin Malone (1999–2001)
Dave Wallace (2001)
Dan Evans (2001–2004)
Paul DePodesta (2004–2005)
Ned Colletti (2005–2014)
Farhan Zaidi (2014–2018)
Brandon Gomes (2022-present)

Public address announcers/organists

From the Dodgers' move to Los Angeles from Brooklyn in 1958, the Dodgers employed a handful of well-known public address announcers; the most famous of which was John Ramsey, who served as the PA voice of the Dodgers from 1958 until his retirement in 1982; he was also well known for announcing at other venerable Los Angeles venues, including the Los Angeles Memorial Coliseum and Sports Arena, and the Forum. Ramsey died in 1990.

From 1958 to 1982, Doug Moore, Philip Petty, and Dennis Packer served as back-up voices for John Ramsey for the Dodgers, California Angels, Los Angeles Chargers, USC football and Los Angeles Rams. Packer was Ramsey's primary backup for the Los Angeles Lakers and Los Angeles Kings until Ramsey's retirement from the Forum in 1978. Thereafter, Packer became the public address announcer for the Lakers, Kings, indoor soccer and indoor tennis events at the Forum.

Nick Nickson, a radio broadcaster for the Los Angeles Kings, replaced John Ramsey as the Dodger Stadium public address announcer in 1983 and served in that capacity through the 1989 season to work with the Kings full-time.

Dennis Packer and Pete Arbogast were emulators of John Ramsey, using the same stentorian style of announcing Ramsey was famous for. Packer and Arbogast shared the stadium announcing chores for the 1994 FIFA World Cup matches at the Rose Bowl. Arbogast won the Dodgers job on the day that Ramsey died on January 25, 1990, by doing a verbatim imitation of Ramsey's opening and closing remarks that were standard at each game. His replacement, in 1994 was Mike Carlucci, who remained as the Dodgers' PA voice announcer until he resigned in 2002 to concentrate on his voiceover and acting career along with his Olympics announcing duties.

From 2003 to 2014, the Dodgers public address announcer was Eric Smith, who also announces for the Los Angeles Clippers and USC Trojans.

On April 3, 2015, the Dodgers announced that former radio broadcaster Todd Leitz was hired to become their new public address announcer. Leitz was an anchor and news reporter in Los Angeles at KNX 1070 AM for 10 years, and a news reporter at KABC 790 for two years.

From 1988 to 2015, Nancy Bea enjoyed popularity behind the Dodger Stadium keyboard similar to Gladys Goodding. Since retirement in 2015, Bea's replacement and current organist is Dieter Ruehle, who also plays at Staples Center for Los Angeles Kings games.

Other
Vin Scully is permanently honored in the Baseball Hall of Fame's "Scribes & Mikemen" exhibit as a result of winning the Ford C. Frick Award in 1982. Frick Award recipients are not official members of the Hall.

Sue Falsone, was the first female physical therapist in Major League baseball, and from 2012 to 2013, was the first female head athletic trainer.

Minor league affiliations

The Los Angeles Dodgers farm system consists of seven minor league affiliates.

See also
1994 in baseball
Dodger Dog
List of Los Angeles Dodgers broadcasters
List of Los Angeles Dodgers managers
List of Los Angeles Dodgers seasons
Los Angeles Dodgers all-time roster
Los Angeles Dodgers minor league players
Roy Campanella Award

Explanatory notes

References

Further reading

Red Barber, Rhubarb in the Catbird Seat
Stanley Cohen, Dodgers! The First 100 Years
Robert W. Creamer, Stengel: His Life and Times
 
Steve Delsohn,  True Blue: The Dramatic History of the Los Angeles Dodgers, Told By the Men Who Lived It
Carl Erskine and Vin Scully, Tales From the Dodger Dugout: Extra Innings
Harvey Froemmer, New York City Baseball
Steve Garvey, "My Bat Boy Days: Lessons I Learned from the Boys of Summer"
Cliff Gewecke, Day by Day in Dodgers History
Andrew Goldblatt, The Giants and the Dodgers: Four Cities, Two Teams, One Rivalry
Richard Goldstein, Superstars and Screwballs: 100 Years of Brooklyn Baseball
Peter Golenbock, Bums: An Oral History of the Brooklyn Dodgers
Doris Kearns Goodwin, Wait Till Next Year: A Memoir
Frank Graham, The Brooklyn Dodgers: An Informal History
Orel Hershiser with Jerry B. Jenkins, Out of the Blue
Donald Honig, The Los Angeles Dodgers: Their First quarter Century
Roger Kahn, The Boys of Summer
Roger Kahn, The Era 1947–1957: When the Yankees, the Giants and the Dodgers Ruled the World
Mark Langill, The Los Angeles Dodgers
Tommy Lasorda with David Fisher, The Artful Dodger
Jane Leavy, Sandy Koufax: A Lefty's Legacy
Joseph McCauley, Ebbets Field: Brooklyn's Baseball Shrine
William McNeil, The Dodgers Encyclopedia
Tom Meany (editor), The Artful Dodgers
Andrew Paul Mele, A Brooklyn Dodgers Reader
John J. Monteleone (editor), Branch Rickey's Little Blue Book
Thomas Oliphant, Praying for Gil Hodges: A Memoir of the 1955 World Series and One Family's Love of the Brooklyn Dodgers
David Plaut, Chasing October: The Dodgers-Giants Pennant Race of 1962
Carl E. Prince, Brooklyn's Dodgers: The Bums, The Borough and The Best of Baseball
Jackie Robinson, I Never Had It Made
Gene Schoor, The Complete Dodgers Record Book
Gene Schoor, The Pee Wee Reese Story
Duke Snider with Bill Gilbert, The Duke of Flatbush
Michael Shapiro, The Last Good Season: Brooklyn, The Dodgers, and Their Final Pennant Race Together
Glen Stout, The Dodgers: 120 Years of Dodgers Baseball
Neil J. Sullivan, The Dodgers Move West
Jules Tygiel, Baseball's Great Experiment: Jackie Robinson and His Legacy
John Weaver, Los Angeles: The Enormous Village, 1781–1981

External links

Los Angeles Dodgers Baseball Reference.com
"The 1960s Dodgers: Two Parts Patience, One Part Creative Insanity" by Steve Treder, November 10, 2004. Article on the 1960s Los Angeles Dodgers in The Hardball Times.

 
Dodgers
Major League Baseball teams
Cactus League
Baseball teams established in 1883
1883 establishments in New York (state)
Baseball teams established in 1958
1958 establishments in California
Companies that filed for Chapter 11 bankruptcy in 2011
Shorty Award winners